
Lubliniec County is a unit of territorial administration and local government (powiat) in Silesian Voivodeship, southern Poland. It came into being on January 1, 1999, as a result of the Polish local government reforms passed in 1998.

As of 2019 its total population is 76,470, out of which the population of Lubliniec is 23,784, that of Woźniki is 4,305, and the rural population is 48,381.

Neighbouring counties
Lubliniec County is bordered by Kłobuck County to the north-east, Częstochowa County and Myszków County to the east, Tarnowskie Góry County to the south, Strzelce County to the south-west, and Olesno County to the north-west.

Administrative division
The county is subdivided into eight gminas (one urban, one urban-rural and six rural). These are listed in the following table, in descending order of population.

Twin regions
 Lörrach (district), Germany

References

 
Lubliniec